Ballickmoyler or Ballicmoyler is a small town in County Laois, Ireland.

Public transport
During the week Ballickmoyler is served by JJ Kavanagh and Sons Abbeyleix/Portlaoise-Athy-Carlow bus route with two daily journeys each way. Bus Éireann route 73 from Waterford to Athlone passes through but does not stop. Rail services may be accessed at Carlow railway station.

See also
 List of towns and villages in Ireland

References

External links
Ballickmoyler (unofficial site)
Site including images of Ballickmoyler
Ballickmoyler: history

Towns and villages in County Laois
Townlands of County Laois